Amarkhuu Borkhuu  (Borkhuugiin Amarkhuu; born 1 July 1987) is a pop singer and actor of Mongolian origin residing in Buryatia, Russia.

Life 
When he was a child his parents moved from Mongolia to Ulan-Ude, Buryatia in Russia.

In 2006, four of his best friends, including Buryatian friend Dorj, recommended him to go to Irkutsk to participate in show Narodniy Artist 3. He rose to popularity in Russia after winning Narodniy Artist 3 (2006), the Russian version of Pop Idol with 61.7% of the vote over Marina Devyatova. In 2010, he starred in a Mongolian-Russian film "Operation ‘Tatar’", where he first met his wife Ariunzul. He is a frontman of award-winning boy band Prime Minister. 

On 19 September 2019 he was arrested by Mongolian police officers while using marijuana which is illegal in Mongolia. He is now in the process of serving 2 years in prison.

In December 2019, he has been acquitted from his 2-year term from the court of appeal and has promised to join the campaign against illegal use of drugs in Mongolia.

References

External links 
 Russian fan website, (Russian)
 Premier-ministr Official website, (Russian)

1987 births
Idols (franchise) participants
Idols (TV series) winners
Living people
Mongolian emigrants to Russia
21st-century Mongolian male singers
Mongolian male film actors
21st-century Mongolian actors
21st-century Russian male singers
21st-century Russian singers
People from Bulgan Province
People from Ulan-Ude